Orion is both a surname and a male given name usually derived from the character from Greek mythology or the constellation named for the character. The name has increased in usage in recent years along with other mythological names. Notable persons with that name include:

People with the surname
Agustín Orión (born 1981), Argentine football player
Alexandre Orion (born 1978), Brazilian artist
Ezra Orion (born 1934–2015), Israeli artist

People with the given name
Orion of Thebes (died  460), grammarian scholar in Ancient Egypt
Orion M. Barber (1857–1930), American politician from Vermont
Orion Ben, British-Israeli actress
Orion Clemens (1825–1897), American politician and brother of Mark Twain
Orion R. Farrar (1866–1929), American composer
Orion Gallin (1928-2021), Israeli discus thrower
Orion Hindawi (born 1980), American software entrepreneur and billionaire
Orion P. Howe (1848–1930), American drummer boy and Medal of Honor recipient
Orion Martin (born 1985), American football player
Orion Samuelson (born 1934), American broadcaster
Orion Story, American drag queen
Orion Weiss (born 1981), American pianist
Orion Simprini (born 1974), lead singer of American band The Orion Experience

See also
Orion (disambiguation)

Notes

English masculine given names
Unisex given names